Robert Alsop (1814 – March 25, 1871) was a merchant and political figure in Newfoundland. He represented Trinity Bay in the Newfoundland and Labrador House of Assembly from 1866 to 1871 as a Liberal and then anti-Confederate.

He was a partner in the mercantile and shipping company R. Alsop and Company based in St. John's. Alsop was first elected in a by-election held in 1866. He served in the Executive Council as chairman of the Board of Works. He was opposed to union with Canada. Alsop was named colonial secretary in 1870. When he ran for reelection because he had been named to a cabinet post, he was defeated but then was named to the Legislative Council, continuing to serve as colonial secretary until his death in St. John's in 1871.

References 

Liberal Party of Newfoundland and Labrador MHAs
Members of the Legislative Council of Newfoundland
1814 births
1871 deaths
Newfoundland Colony people
Colonial Secretaries of Newfoundland